Islands is the second album by English new wave band Kajagoogoo, released on 21 May 1984 on the EMI label.

Background
This was the band's first album without lead vocalist Limahl, who had been fired by the band in mid-1983 and went on to pursue a solo career. Bassist Nick Beggs, already the group's main background singer, took over lead vocal duties, and also wrote the lyrics. The album was co-produced by the band themselves, now a four-piece group, along with Colin Thurston, who had also produced their debut, White Feathers. It is the final album to date to feature founding drummer Jez Strode.

Release
The album did not sell as well as its predecessor, peaking at No. 35 in the UK Albums Chart. The album's first single, "Big Apple", reached No. 8 in the UK, but subsequent singles were less successful, with "The Lion's Mouth" peaking at No. 25 and "Turn Your Back on Me" reaching No. 47.

In the U.S., the band had renamed themselves Kaja and Islands was reconfigured and released as a mini-LP titled Extra Play. It contained only seven tracks (five from the album and two bonus remixes) and peaked at No. 185 on the Billboard 200. On the U.S. edition, the version of "Turn Your Back on Me" was different from the original UK version, having been remixed by Steve Thompson and Michael Barbiero. This remix was released as a single in the U.S. and reached No. 2 on the dance charts.

In 2004, the original UK album was remastered and reissued on CD with seven bonus tracks.

Track listing
All songs written by Kajagoogoo.

Side one
"The Lion's Mouth" – 3:32
"Big Apple" – 4:09
"The Power to Forgive" – 4:45
"Melting the Ice Away" – 5:10

Side two
"Turn Your Back on Me" – 3:58
"Islands" – 4:52
"On a Plane" – 4:14
"Part of Me Is You" – 3:52
"The Loop (Instrumental)" – 4:40

2004 CD bonus tracks
"Turn Your Back on Me (Thompson & Barbiero US Mix)" – 3:56
"The Pump Rooms of Bath (Instrumental)" – 2:31
"The Garden (Instrumental)" – 2:51
"Monochromatic (Live)" - 4:08
"Big Apple (Metro Mix)" – 6:05
"The Lion's Mouth (The Beast Mix)" – 5:37
"Turn Your Back on Me (Extended Dance Mix)" – 5:03

Extra Play (U.S.-only mini-album)
Side one
"Turn Your Back on Me (Thompson and Barbiero U.S. Mix)" – 3:56
"The Power to Forgive" – 4:46
"Big Apple" – 4:02
"Melting the Ice Away" – 5:18
"The Lion's Mouth" – 3:30

Side two
"Turn Your Back on Me (Flipped Disc Mix)" – 6:58
"Big Apple (Metro Mix)" – 6:02

Extra Play (reissue)
Side one
"The Lion's Mouth" – 3:34 
"Big Apple" – 4:10 
"The Power to Forgive" – 4:46 
"Melting the Ice Away" – 5:20

Side two
"Turn Your Back on Me  (Thompson and Barbiero U.S. Mix)" – 3:58 
"Islands" – 4:53 
"On a Plane" – 4:14 
"Part of Me Is You" – 3:54 
"The Loop" – 4:38

Personnel

Kajagoogoo
Nick Beggs – vocal (tracks 1–8), bass guitar (tracks 1–4, 7), Chapman Stick (tracks 1, 5, 9), percussion (tracks 1, 2, 5, 7, 9), fretless bass (tracks 6, 8)
Stuart Neale – synthesizers (tracks 1–9), backing vocals (tracks 1, 2, 5, 7), acoustic piano (tracks 2–4, 6–9), vocoder (tracks 3, 5), PPG programming (tracks 4, 5, 7, 9), percussion (track 6), sequencer (track 8)
Steve Askew – guitars (tracks 1–3, 5, 6), percussion (track 2), semi acoustic guitars (tracks 4, 7, 9), backing vocals (track 5), effects (track 6), electric guitar (tracks 7–9), semi acoustic Spanish guitar (track 8)
Jez Strode – drums (tracks 1–9), percussion (tracks 1–5, 7–9), programming (tracks 5, 6, 8)

Additional musicians
Colin Thurston - backing vocals (tracks 1, 3–5, 7), percussion (track 2), vocoder (track 5)
Guy Barker – trumpets (tracks 1, 2, 7, 9)
Phil Todd – saxophones (tracks 1, 3, 7, 9), solo (track 7), flutes (track 7)
Chris Hunter – saxophone (tracks 1, 2, 7)
Pete Beachill – trombone (tracks 1, 8, 9)
Annie McCaig – backing vocals (tracks 4, 8)
David Geawt – backing vocals (track 5)

Technical
Colin Thurston – co-producer
Kajagoogoo – co-producer, brass arrangements (track 8)
Guy Barker – brass arrangements (track 9)
Phil Todd – brass arrangements (track 9)
Rob Hahnet with Terry & Mark – engineers (Jacob's Studios)
Mark, Neil, Trevor & John – engineers (Roundhouse)
Robin & Chris – engineers (Good Earth)
Andy & Hutch – engineers (Farmyard)
Steve Chase – engineer (The Manor)
Dick Jones – assistant engineer
Gordon Vicary – cutting engineer
Kathy Bryan – mastering
Richard Haughton – band photos
Markus Robinson – lighting
Tim - Gud Luc – make-up
Toni & Guy – hairdressers
Mick Karn – inner photo (Thai picture)
Cream – original sleeve design
The Red Room – re-issue design
Nigel Reeve – re-issue project coordination

References

External links
 KajaFax - The Officially Approved Limahl & Kajagoogoo Community & Fan Club
 Unofficial Limahl & Kajagoogoo YouTube video archives

1984 albums
Kajagoogoo albums
Albums produced by Colin Thurston
EMI Records albums